Alfredo Rafael Sosa (Albanian : Rafael Soza; born 7 May 1988) is an Argentine professional footballer who plays as a forward.

Club career
Malacarne started his career with Argentine giants Estudiantes de La Plata as a teenager. He played mainly for the reserve and youth teams during his time in Argentina. After negotiations with Albanian club Dinamo Tirana, Estudiantes decided to offer the Albanians Rafael Sosa and Nicolas Delmonte on loan until the end of the Albanian Superliga 2009–10 season.

Dinamo Tirana
He completed his move to Dinamo Tirana on 26 June 2009. He arrived late from Argentina and completed all the formalities at the 'Dinamo Complex' before training with the rest of the squad for the first time. He became Dinamo's first Argentine signing of the 2009–10 season.

He made his competitive debut for the club in the Europa League 2009-10 1st leg tie against FC Lahti. He performed well on his debut which in the end didn't help the club much as they lost 4–1 to the Finnish side. Rafael Sosa came on as a substitute for Serbian striker Mladen Brkic. Along with the 2nd leg in which Rafael Sosa didn't manage feature in, the aggregate score was 4–3 which sent the Albania side crashing out of the Competition.

The Argentine made his league debut on the opening day of the season on 23 August 2009 in an away match against newly promoted KS Kastrioti Kruje. Rafael Sosa started the game in midfield and helped his side to a 3–1 win. The most important goal scored by the Argentinian newcomer to the 'blues'of Tirana was that one, and the only one scored in the away match Besa-Dinamo 0–1. This goal let Dinamo stand to the top of classification. The same player scored against the only goal of the home match this time Dinamo-Tirana, so that Dinamo went 15 points ahead Besa, since the 15th fixture.

During his first press conference in Albania Rafael Sosa explained how he was happy with his move to Albania and that although he found it difficult to settle in at a new club which is his first away from Argentina, he would give his 100% for the club. He also stated that he doesn't expect to score many goals, he just wants to play good football for Dinamo for as long as he is there.

Skënderbeu Korçë
On 19 August he signed for Skënderbeu Korçë. He made 29 appearances and scored 13 goals. He was Skenderbeu's top scorer.

Laçi
Sosa returned in Albania in January 2015 to join top flight side Laçi on a contract until the end of the season. He signed the contract on 14th and was given squad number 17. He made his return debut 11 days later in the championship matchday 19 against Partizani Tirana which finished in a 1–1 home draw, with Sosa appearing in the last 15 minutes. Sosa made 10 league appearances until the end of the season, in addition 2 cup matches, as Laçi 5th in championship but won the Albanian Cup. Sosa left the club on 6 June 2015 following the end of the season by terminating the contract by mutual consent.

Honours 
Dinamo Tirana
 Albanian Superliga: 2009–10
Skënderbeu Korçë
 Albanian Superliga: 2010–11
Laçi
 Albanian Cup: 2014–15

References

1988 births
Living people
People from Catamarca Province
Argentine footballers
Association football midfielders
Association football forwards
Estudiantes de La Plata footballers
Argentine expatriate footballers
Expatriate footballers in Albania
Argentine expatriate sportspeople in Albania
Kategoria Superiore players
FK Dinamo Tirana players
Flamurtari Vlorë players
KF Skënderbeu Korçë players
KF Laçi players
FC Sheriff Tiraspol players
Moldovan Super Liga players
Expatriate footballers in Moldova
Argentine expatriate sportspeople in Moldova